Maria Rosario Clarissa Singh-Vergeire (born Maria Rosario Clarissa Dumandan Singh) is a Filipino physician and public health official serving as the Acting Secretary of the Department of Health since July 14, 2022, following her appointment by President Bongbong Marcos. She served as an undersecretary as well as the spokesperson of the Department of Health since 2015 under the Benigno Aquino III and Rodrigo Duterte administrations.

Life and career

She is the third of six children born to barangay chairman Harry Singh and lawyer Clara Singh, while her sister Maria Filomena Singh is a lawyer and judge currently serving as an Associate Justice of the Supreme Court since 2022; their family lives in Marikina. Vergeire earned her bachelor's degree in zoology from the University of Santo Tomas and her Doctor of Medicine degree from De La Salle College of Medicine (now De La Salle Medical and Health Sciences Institute). She later earned a Master of Public Health degree from the University of the Philippines Manila.

Starting in 1996, Vergeire spent 11 years working at the Marikina City Health Office. She joined the Department of Health in 2007 as a medical officer in the Health Policy Development and Planning Bureau.

References

External links 

 Official profile in the Department of Health website

|-

Year of birth missing (living people)
Living people
People from Marikina
University of Santo Tomas alumni
Duterte administration personnel
Bongbong Marcos administration personnel
Bongbong Marcos administration cabinet members
Secretaries of Health of the Philippines